A carboxylate transporter is a membrane transport protein that transports carboxylate.

They are responsible for the reabsorption of filtered carboxylate in renal physiology, resulting in a 100% reabsorption in the proximal tubule.

In proximal tubule
In the renal proximal tubule, there are several kinds of carboxylate transporters in the apical membrane and the basolateral membrane.

Apical
 Na-monocarboxylate cotransporter
 3Na-dicarboxylate cotransporter
 3Na-tricarboxylate cotransporter

Basolateral
 H-monocarboxylate cotransporter
 organic anion-dicarboxylate exchanger

References

Transport proteins